Villa Clara is a village located in the Villaguay Department, in the center of the province of Entre Ríos, Argentina.
According to the Argentine census bureau, it had 2,726 residents in 2010.  

The village was named after Maurice de Hirsch's wife, Clara Bischoffsheim (1833 – 1899). Hirsch was a German Jewish philanthropist who sponsored large-scale Jewish emigration to Argentina.

Jewish Argentine settlements
Populated places in Entre Ríos Province
Populated places established in 1902
1902 establishments in Argentina

References